Kiplingcotes railway station was a minor railway station on the York–Beverley line, in the East Riding of Yorkshire, England. It opened on 1 May 1865 and served the nearby village of Kiplingcotes.

It was built originally for the personal use of a local landowner and MP, Lord Hotham, as an incentive for him to allow the railway to pass through his estates. The station closed after the last train ran on 27 November 1965 along with the rest of the line. The station building, platforms and signal box survive unaltered, as does the station master's house.

References

External links

Station on navigable 1947 O.S. map

Disused railway stations in the East Riding of Yorkshire
Former North Eastern Railway (UK) stations
Beeching closures in England
Railway stations in Great Britain opened in 1865
Railway stations in Great Britain closed in 1965